With This Ring (originally known as Happily Ever After) was a prime time panel show aired by the DuMont Television Network on Sundays from January 21, 1951, to March 11, 1951.

The show featured engaged white, opposite-sex couples discussing marriage and marital problems. The show was initially hosted by Bill Slater, but the show quickly changed hosts to Martin Gabel, then left the air. Beatrice Straight appeared on at least one episode.

This show is not related in any way to a 15-minute syndicated program of the same name that aired weekly (usually on Sundays) on local stations throughout the U.S. for about 25 years beginning in the early 1970s. The latter program was a Roman Catholic-produced show concerning the church's doctrinal and moral positions on marriage and family life, and was produced at WJBK-TV in Detroit.

See also
List of programs broadcast by the DuMont Television Network
List of surviving DuMont Television Network broadcasts

References

Bibliography
David Weinstein, The Forgotten Network: DuMont and the Birth of American Television (Philadelphia: Temple University Press, 2004) 
Alex McNeil, Total Television, Fourth edition (New York: Penguin Books, 1980) 
Tim Brooks and Earle Marsh, The Complete Directory to Prime Time Network TV Shows, Third edition (New York: Ballantine Books, 1964)

External links
With This Ring at IMDB
DuMont historical website

DuMont Television Network original programming
1950s American game shows
1951 American television series debuts
1951 American television series endings
Black-and-white American television shows
Lost television shows